The Tummil River is a river of the Marlborough Region of New Zealand's South Island. It flows northwest from rough hill country north of Mount Horrible to reach the Avon River southwest of Blenheim.

See also
List of rivers of New Zealand

References

Rivers of the Marlborough Region
Rivers of New Zealand